Tony Paul Way (born 7 October 1978) is an English actor, comedian, and writer. He is best known for playing characters in a number of British comedy TV series including Extras, After Life, Black Books and Bang, Bang, It's Reeves and Mortimer, as well as comedy movies including Sightseers and Ali G Indahouse. He has since moved into drama, appearing as Plague in The Girl with the Dragon Tattoo, Dontos Hollard in HBO's Game of Thrones, and Thomas Nashe in Anonymous.

Early life
Way was born in Rochford, Essex and grew up in Wickford, Essex.

Career
Way started his career in comedy and acting at the age of 17 when he, Rhys Thomas, Stephen Burge, and Glynne Wiley started making comedy videos as sketch group Stay Alive Pepi while at college. The videos were noticed by Bob Mortimer and Charlie Higson, who gave Way his first television appearances in a sketch on The Fast Show and in several sketches in Bang, Bang, It's Reeves and Mortimer. Way went on to write for and perform in more comedy shows, including Mongrels, Extras, Spaced, and Tittybangbang.

Way has also performed in many television shows and feature films, including The Girl with the Dragon Tattoo, Anonymous, Tunnel of Love, Finding Neverland, Cheeky, Ali G Indahouse, Fairytales, Down Terrace and Sightseers. From 2012 to 2014, Way appeared as Ser Dontos Hollard on HBO's Game of Thrones. In 2014, he co-starred in the sci-fi film Edge of Tomorrow, and made an appearance on Doctor Who. Since 2013 he has played Terry in BBC Radio 4 sitcom Seekers, written by his friend and collaborator Stephen Burge. Way also still regularly works with Rhys Thomas on the Thomas and Way Podcast, which they have been recording irregularly since 2011.

Personal life
Way lives in Hackney, London.

Filmography

Film

Television
{| class="wikitable sortable plainrowheaders"
! Year
! Title
! Role
! class="unsortable" | Notes
|-
| 1994
| The Fast Show
| New Boy
|
|-
| 1998–2001
| Eleven O'Clock Show
| 
| Writer
|-
| rowspan="3"|1999
| Bang, Bang, It's Reeves and Mortimer
| Various characters
|-
| Small Potatoes
| Elwood
|
|-
| Spaced 
| Paper Boy
|-
| 2000–2001
| Randall and Hopkirk
| Hammer of God
|
|-
| 2000–2004
| Black Books
| Cinema Clerk/Burger Boy
|
|-
| 2000–2011
| My Family
| Himself
| Guest cast
|-
| 2001–2002
| Fun at the Funeral Parlour
| Gwynne Thomas
|
|-
| 2003–2004
| Hardware
| Cliff
|
|-
| rowspan="2"|2005
| Monkey Trousers
| Various characters
| 
|-
| Extras
| Chef
| 
|-
| 2005–2007
| Tittybangbang
| 
|-
| 2006
| Blunder
| 
| Writer
|-
| rowspan="4"|2008
| Fairy Tales 
| Rapunzel
|
|-
| No Heroics
| Praying Mantis
|-
| The Wall
| Various characters
| Writer
|-
| Torn Up Tales
| Clint "The Beast" Beastwood
|
|-
| 2008–2009
| Crash
| Various characters
| Writer
|-
| rowspan="2"|2009–2011
|Shooting Stars
| Various characters
| Writer
|-
| The Impressions Show
| Various characters
| Writer
|-
| 2009
| 2009 Unwrapped with Miranda Hart
| Arthur
|
|-
| rowspan="3"|2010
| Money
| Fat Paul
|
|-
|Mongrels
| Gary
|
|-
| Above Their Stations
| Techno Benson
|
|-
| 2011
| Life's Too Short
|
|
|-
| 2012
| Sherlock
| 
|
|-
| 2012; 2014
| Game of Thrones
| Ser Dontos Hollard
|
|-
| rowspan="4"|2014
| Derek
| Pete
|
|-
| Doctor Who
| Alf
|
|-
| Not Going Out
| Tony
|
|-
| The Life of Rock with Brian Pern
| Ned/Captain Cupnutz/Rick Parfitt
|
|-
| rowspan="8"|2015
| Asylum
| Alan
|
|-
| Pompidou
| Merrick
|
|-
| Drunk History
| Various characters
|
|-
| House of Fools
| Punter/Butcher Brother
|
|-
| Inside No. 9| Michael
|
|-
| Murder in Successville| Harry Styles
|
|-
| SunTrap| Glenn
|
|-
| Jekyll and Hyde| Silas
|
|-
| 2016
| Brian Pern: 45 Years of Prog and Roll| Ned
|
|-
| 2016–2017
| Zapped
| Chestnut
|
|-
| rowspan="2"|2017
| Philip K. Dick's Electric Dreams| Carmichael
|
|-
| Tracey Breaks the News| Various characters
|
|-
| 2018
| Collateral| Conor
|
|-
| 2019–2022
| After Life| Lenny
|
|-
| 2019
| Giri/Haji 
| Roy
|
|-
| rowspan="2"|2020
| Mandy| Sergei
|
|-
| Des| Dyno Rod Engineer
|
|-
|}

RadioSeekers (BBC Radio 4) – TerryThomas and Way PodcastThe Don't Watch With Mother Sketchbook – Various characters, also writer

StageRichard Sandlings Perfect Movie – Queen's Head, LondonLenny Beige's Night of Legends – Pigalle Club, London Oram and Meeten's Club Fantastico – Lowdown, The Albany, LondonStay Alive Pepi – Canal Cafe, LondonStay Alive Pepi – Assembly Rooms, EdinburghStay Alive Pepi'' – De Hems, London

References

External links
Official website

1978 births
English male film actors
English male television actors
English male radio actors
Living people
People from Rochford
Male actors from Essex
20th-century English male actors
21st-century English male actors
People from Wickford